Yutaka Kawashima (born May 2, 1942) was a Japanese diplomat. He was a graduate of the University of Tokyo and the University of Cambridge. He was Ambassador of Japan to Israel (1997–1999).

After retirement he worked at the Brookings Institution and taught at the John F. Kennedy School of Government. In 2003, he published the book Japanese Foreign Policy at the Crossroads.

He served as Grand Chamberlain of Japan from 2007 to 2015.

References

1942 births
Ambassadors of Japan to Israel
University of Tokyo alumni
Alumni of the University of Cambridge
Living people